Anders Laustrup Dreyer (born 2 May 1998) is a Danish professional footballer who plays for Belgian club RSC Anderlecht and the Denmark national team.

The right winger previously played for Esbjerg fB, Brighton, St Mirren, SC Heerenveen, FC Midtjylland and FC Rubin Kazan.

Club career

Esbjerg fB
On 20 September 2016, Esbjerg fB confirmed that they had extended Dreyer's contract by one year until 2018. But he continued playing for their U19 squad.

Dreyer got his debut on 2 April 2017 in a 0–0 draw against Randers FC in the Danish Superliga coming on in the 72nd minute to replace Awer Mabil. He scored his first goal for Esbjerg on 22 April 2017 against AC Horsens.

He was promoted to the first team squad for the 2017–18 season in the Danish 1st Division. In this season he finished as the league topscorer with 18 goals, helping Esbjerg win promotion to the Superliga. On 27 May 2018, Dreyer scored his first hat-trick of his career in the second leg of their promotion playoff games against Silkeborg IF. His 3 goals secured a 3–1 aggregate lead to take Esbjerg back into the Superliga. Dreyer ended the season as the topscorer 2017–18 Danish 1st Division, scoring 18 goals.

Brighton & Hove Albion
On 7 August 2018, Dreyer was sold to Brighton & Hove Albion. Dreyer started on the U23 team, and got his debut in the first game of the season against Liverpool U23 on 8 October 2018. In January 2019, Dreyer joined St Mirren on loan until the end of the season. After picking up an knee injury at the end of April, Dreyer returned to Brighton & Hove Albion and missed the end of the season. Dreyer scored one goal in his eleven appearances for the club.

On 23 August 2019, SC Heerenveen announced, that they had signed Dreyer on loan for the 2019–20 season. He made his debut 8 days later coming on as a substitute in a 1–1 home draw against Fortuna Sittard.

FC Midtjylland
On 6 January 2020, FC Midtjylland announced that Dreyer had returned to Denmark and signed a four-and-a-half year contract with the club. His strong start – two goals and one assist in his first two appearances for the club – led to him being named as the Danish Superliga Player of the Month for February 2020.

Rubin Kazan
On 28 August 2021, he signed a five-year contract with Russian club FC Rubin Kazan. On his debut on 13 September 2021 he scored a hat-trick against FC Ural Yekaterinburg. He became the first player in the history of the league to score three goals in their first game in the league.

On 11 March 2022, Dreyer's contract with Rubin was suspended until 30 June 2022 according to special FIFA regulations related to the Russian invasion of Ukraine. The regulations allow foreign players in Russia to suspend their contracts until the end of the 2021–22 season and sign with a club outside of Russia until that date.

Return to Midtjylland
On 16 March 2022, Dreyer returned to FC Midtjylland on a loan until 30 June 2022. On 6 July 2022, he transferred to Midtjylland on a permanent basis and signed a four-year contract.

Anderlecht
On 15 January 2023, Dreyer signed a four-and-a-half-year contract with Anderlecht in Belgium.

International career
In November 2020, he was called up to Kasper Hjulmand's senior squad for the friendly against Sweden due to several cancellations from, among others, the Danish national team players playing in England, due to the COVID-19 restrictions, as well as a case of COVID-19 in the squad, which had put several national team players in quarantine.

He made his debut on 12 November 2021 in a World Cup qualifier against the Faroe Islands.

Career statistics

Honours
Esbjerg fB
 Danish 1st Division play-offs: 2018

FC Midtjylland
 Danish Superliga: 2019–20
 Danish Cup: 2021–22

Individual
 Danish Superliga Player of the Month: February 2020

References

External links
 

1998 births
People from Esbjerg Municipality
Sportspeople from the Region of Southern Denmark
Living people
Danish men's footballers
Denmark youth international footballers
Denmark under-21 international footballers
Denmark international footballers
Association football forwards
Esbjerg fB players
Brighton & Hove Albion F.C. players
St Mirren F.C. players
SC Heerenveen players
FC Midtjylland players
FC Rubin Kazan players
R.S.C. Anderlecht players
Danish Superliga players
Danish 1st Division players
Scottish Professional Football League players
Russian Premier League players
Eredivisie players
Belgian Pro League players
Danish expatriate men's footballers
Expatriate footballers in England
Danish expatriate sportspeople in England
Expatriate footballers in Scotland
Danish expatriate sportspeople in Scotland
Expatriate footballers in the Netherlands
Danish expatriate sportspeople in the Netherlands
Expatriate footballers in Russia
Danish expatriate sportspeople in Russia
Expatriate footballers in Belgium
Danish expatriate sportspeople in Belgium